Marcantonio Genovesi (died 7 November 1624) was a Roman Catholic prelate who served as Bishop of Isernia (1611–1624) and Bishop of Montemarano (1603–1611).

Biography
On 9 May 1603, Marcantonio Genovesi was appointed during the papacy of Pope Clement VIII as Bishop of Montemarano.
On 11 May 1603, he was consecrated bishop by Mariano Pierbenedetti, Cardinal-Priest of Santi Marcellino e Pietro. 
On 26 September 1611, he was appointed during the papacy of Pope Paul V as Bishop of Isernia.
He served as Bishop of Isernia until his death on 7 November 1624.

While bishop, he was the principal co-consecrator of François-Etienne Dulci, Archbishop of Avignon (1609); and Gregorius Pedrocca, Bishop of Acqui (1620).

References

External links and additional sources
 (for Chronology of Bishops) 
 (for Chronology of Bishops)  

17th-century Italian Roman Catholic bishops
Bishops appointed by Pope Clement VIII
Bishops appointed by Pope Paul V
1624 deaths